Ana Paula Rojas Huarayo (born 17 July 1997) is a Bolivian footballer who plays as a midfielder for Astor and the Bolivia women's national team.

Early life
Rojas hails from the Cochabamba Department.

International career
Rojas represented Bolivia at the 2012 South American U-17 Women's Championship and the 2014 South American U-20 Women's Championship. At senior level, she played two Copa América Femenina editions (2014 and 2018).

References

1997 births
Living people
Women's association football midfielders
Bolivian women's footballers
People from Cochabamba Department
Bolivia women's international footballers